The Order of the Plum Blossom (also called as Order of the Ehwa) was the Order of chivalry of the Korean Empire. It was the third highest order of Korean Empire.

History 
Order of the Plum Blossom was the part of the establishment of orders in 1900 by Gojong of Korea. Gojong said that the order of the Plum Blossom was given to those who already got the first class of Order of the Taegeuk and has special merit after receiving Order of the Taeguk. Only the Emperor can decide the recipient of Order of the Plum Blossom. It was named after flower Ehwa which was the national flower of the Korean Empire. There were 62 recipients of Order of the Plum Blossom.

Form 
Order of the Plum Blossom was divided into Grand Cordon and Medal. Perimeter of Grand Cordon was 7.5 centimeters and the medal was 7 centimeters. Two were just the same but size was only difference. They were made of silver and gold. On the obverse of medal, '훈공정장' was engraved.

Grand Cordon was worn from the right shoulder to the left flank, it is crossed at the end, folded with a cloth, and a suit is attached, and the head is hung on the left chest.

Notable recipients 

 Shim Soon-taek on 16 March 1902
 Inoue Kaoru on 24 March 1902
 Yi Jae-wan on 16 September 1904
 Min Young-hwan on 16 September 1904
 Komura Jutarō on 19 September 1904
 Yikuang on 27 February 1905
 Kuwashi Okazawa on 7 March 1905
 Yi Jae-gak on 19 March 1905
 Ōura Kanetake on 28 May 1905
 Kuroki Tamemoto on 28 December 1906
 Terauchi Masatake on 28 December 1906

References 

Recipients of the Order of the Plum Blossom
Orders of chivalry
Orders, decorations, and medals of the Korean Empire
1900 establishments in Korea
1910 disestablishments in Korea